Lewis and Clark Township is a township in northwestern St. Louis County, Missouri. The population is over 32,000.

The major municipality in Lewis and Clark Township is Hazelwood.

Representation
 U.S. House District 1
 State Senate District 7
 State House District 78

References

Townships in St. Louis County, Missouri
Townships in Missouri